Chah Pas (also Romanized as Chāh Pas; also known as Chāh Paz) is a village in Shamil Rural District, Takht District, Bandar Abbas County, Hormozgan Province, Iran. At the 2006 census, its population was 235, in 51 families.

References 

Populated places in Bandar Abbas County